Willi Heckmann (born 23 February 1952) is a German former wrestler. He competed in the men's freestyle 48 kg at the 1976 Summer Olympics.

References

External links
 

1952 births
Living people
German male sport wrestlers
Olympic wrestlers of West Germany
Wrestlers at the 1976 Summer Olympics
Sportspeople from Karlsruhe (region)
People from Rhein-Neckar-Kreis